Astrothelium dicoloratum is a species of corticolous (bark-dwelling), crustose lichen in the family Trypetheliaceae. Found in Venezuela, it was formally described as a new species in 2016 by André Aptroot. The thallus is completely covered with bright orange pigment. There is a single ascospore in the asci. These spores are hyaline, ellipsoid in shape, with 9 to 11 septa and dimensions of 50–75 by 11–15 µm. Chemical analysis of the lichen using thin-layer chromatography revealed the presence of an unnamed anthraquinone.

References

dicoloratum
Lichen species
Lichens described in 2016
Lichens of Venezuela
Taxa named by André Aptroot